Merchandize Liquidators, LLC, is an American wholesale liquidator and distributor in the closeouts industry. Working with manufacturers and department stores, the company specializes in buying all available overstock merchandise. The company works on bringing products from Macy’s, Sears, CVS and other major US retailers, to the secondary markets. The company also sells new, overstock, surplus, used and salvaged goods. Clients include retailers, eBay sellers, Flea Market vendors, and jobbers. Merchandize Liquidators was cited by Inc. Magazine as one of the fastest-growing companies in the US in 2012 2011 and 2010.

History

Founded in 2003 by Yosef Martin, Merchandize Liquidators initially focused on brokering goods from buyers to private sellers.

Current
In 2010, 2011 and 2012, Inc. named it one of the fastest-growing companies in the nation. In 2012, Merchandize Liquidators doubled its revenues. Merchandize Liquidators 2011 gross sales were $5.4 million and the percentage revenue growth for the four-year period through 2011 was more than 700 percent, according to a report by a leading trade publication. Merchandize Liquidators was ranked #523 on the Inc. 5000 list for 2011, which was published in August 2012. The report also ranked the company #18 in Miami, and #35 for Business Products and Services. On 2012 it has a 9.1 million gross sales. 80% of the company’s goods are also shipped to Latin America, Russia, Dubai, New Zealand, and Africa.

Merchandize Liquidators was purchased entirely from Yosef Martin in 2016 for an undisclosed amount by a private equity group. Yosef Martin is no longer associated with Merchandize Liquidators.

Founder
Yosef Martin, an Israeli-American immigrant, founded the company in 2003 while pursuing a BA degree at Florida International University. Entering into the closeouts market in 2003, Martin began the company with $375, relying on search engine optimization to build the business. In 2010, the company experienced a three-year growth rate of 265% according to a report by Inc. magazine. Martin resides in Miami Beach, Florida.

Recognition
 Inc. Magazine, Fastest Growing Companies in the US, 2012
 Inc. Magazine, Fastest Growing Companies in the US, 2011
 Inc. Magazine, Fastest Growing Companies in the US, 2010

References

External links
 Merchandize Liquidators
 TruckloadLiquidation.online is a Merchandize Liquidators Website
 Liquidation Pallets a Merchandise Liquidators Website

Retail companies of the United States
American companies established in 2003
Companies based in Miami-Dade County, Florida
Retail companies established in 2003
2003 establishments in Florida